Defender (subtitled For All Mankind outside North America) is a shoot 'em up video game developed in October 2002 for the PlayStation 2, and Xbox, and was ported to the GameCube the following month, followed by a port to the mobile phone version published by THQ in 2003. The game was also rereleased for Xbox 360's Live Arcade in November 2006. It is a remake of the 1981 game of the same name. Featuring three-dimensional (3D) graphics, the game is set on multiple planets and moons within the Solar System where the player must defeat waves of invading aliens while protecting astronauts.

A separate version of the game was released for the Game Boy Advance. Despite sharing a name, box art and a release date with the console versions, it is a different game.

Gameplay 
The player picks up humans, who are in danger from aliens, and brings them to a drop zone for extraction. The enemy landers are attacking them, and will constantly try to pick them up for themselves. Once a human is stolen, the player has a short amount of time to blast the lander and catch the slowly falling human. If the player fails to free the human, they are absorbed into the lander and the lander is transformed into a much more difficult enemy. If the human hits the ground from falling they will die. The enemies are a handful of other alien craft, including some ground units that can turn humans into zombies.

Game Boy Advance version 
A separate version of the game was released for the Game Boy Advance. It contains a faithful recreation of the 1981 Defender, and an updated version with digitized sprites and new game modes.

Development

Reception 

The game received "mixed or average reviews" on all platforms except the Game Boy Advance version, which received "unfavorable" reviews, according to the review aggregation website Metacritic.

References

External links

2002 video games
Game Boy Advance games
Game Boy Advance-only games
GameCube games
Midway video games
Mobile games
PlayStation 2 games
Video game remakes
Video games developed in the United States
Video games set on fictional planets
Xbox games
Xbox 360 games
Xbox Live Arcade games
Digital Eclipse games
7 Studios games
Lavastorm games